René Jules Libeer (28 November 1934 – 12 November 2006) was a French flyweight boxer. Competing as an amateur he won bronze medals at the 1956 Summer Olympics and 1957 European Championships. Next year he turned professional and in 1965 won the vacant European title against Paul Chervet. After defending it three times he lost it in 1967 to Fernando Atzori. Their rematch the same year ended in a draw, after which Libeer retired from boxing.

1956 Olympic results
Below is the record of René Libeer, a French flyweight boxer who competed at the 1956 Melbourne Olympics:

 Round of 32: bye
 Round of 16: defeated Pyo Hyeon-gi (South Korea) on points
 Quarterfinal: defeated Kenji Yonekura (Japan) on points
 Semifinal: lost to Terence Spinks (Great Britain ) on points (was awarded bronze medal)

References

External links
 

1934 births
2006 deaths
Flyweight boxers
Boxers at the 1956 Summer Olympics
Olympic boxers of France
Olympic bronze medalists for France
Olympic medalists in boxing
Sportspeople from Roubaix
French male boxers
Medalists at the 1956 Summer Olympics